Ali ibn Shaykh Muhammad ibn ‘Abd al-Rahman was a prominent Persian physician who is thought to have lived in the 17th century.
 
Little is known of this author. What is certain is that he composed a large Persian medical encyclopedia, in didactic verse, titled Jawahir al-maqal ("The Gems of Discourse") which is preserved in only two copies: one at The National Library of Medicine, and one in Oxford University.
 
It is thought that he was a rather recent figure, probably from the seventeenth century. But he must certainly have lived before 1791, when an owner's note was appended to the undated NLM manuscript.

Sources

For the undated (18th-century) Oxford manuscript, see:

 E. Sachau and Hermann Ethé, Catalogue of the Persian, Turkish, Hindûstânî and Pushtû Manuscripts in the Bodleian Library. Part I: The Persian Manuscripts, Oxford: Clarendon Press, 1889, col. 969 no. 1609.

See also
List of Iranian scientists
Medical Encyclopedia of Islam and Iran

17th-century Iranian physicians